Byron Hasael Rojas Hernandez (born 23 June 1990) is a Nicaraguan professional boxer who held the WBA minimumweight title in 2016.

Career
Rojas took up boxing after being bullied in his teenage years. He was first trained by Roger Rivas. He became an amateur national champion before turning professional. Rojas drew three times in his first ten fights, and he also lost two bouts around that time, both by split decision.

Rojas won his first regional title, the Nicaraguan minimumweight title, on 30 November 2013, with a unanimous decision win over Jose Aguilar. Rojas defended his title on 22 August 2015, defeating Byron Castellón in a wide unanimous decision (98-93, 97–93, 97–92). On his next fight, Rojas would go on to face WBA and IBO minimumweight champion Hekkie Budler in Kempton Park. Budler was considered a wide favourite prior to the fight, but Rojas won a close fight marred by headbutts via unanimous decision (115-113, 115–113, 115–113). Only the WBA title was at stake, but Budler was stripped of his IBO title after the loss. The WBA then ordered a match-up between Rojas interim champion Knockout CP Freshmart in April 2016. The fight took place on 29 June in Khon Kaen. The fight was widely considered boring, as Knockout clinched through most of the fight to no warning from the referee. Nevertheless, he won the fight by unanimous decision (115-113, 115–113, 115–113) to unseat Rojas.

After losing the world title, Rojas stringed eight wins together, all of them in Nicaragua, and joined trainer Wilmer Hernández. Rojas was named as the WBA's mandatory challenger, and a rematch between Knockout CP Freshmart and Rojas was signed for 28 November 2018. Knockout won the fight by unanimous decision, with scores of 115–113, 117-111 and 116–112.

Professional boxing record

References

External links

Living people
Nicaraguan male boxers
World Boxing Association champions
Mini-flyweight boxers
World mini-flyweight boxing champions
1990 births